Manni Norkett (born 30 October 2004) is an English professional footballer who plays as a forward for Manchester United.

Club career
Born in Nottingham and raised in North Muskham, Norkett first started playing football at under-5 level with local side Collingham, also spending time with Deano’s Soccer Academy, run by former Saint Kitts and Nevis international Dean Walling. He also represented the youth academies of Newark Town and RHP Colts, before joining Premier League side Manchester United in 2018.

In December 2021, Norkett was sent on a month-long loan to Northern Premier League side Gainsborough Trinity, becoming the first player to tread the path from Old Trafford to The Northolme since Tommy Arkesden in 1907.

Career statistics

Club

Notes

References

2004 births
Living people
Footballers from Nottingham
English footballers
Association football forwards
Northern Premier League players
Newark Town F.C. players
Manchester United F.C. players
Gainsborough Trinity F.C. players